The George Ellery Hale Prize, or Hale Prize, is awarded annually by the Solar Physics Division of the American Astronomical Society for outstanding contributions over an extended period of time to the field of solar astronomy. The prize is named in memory of George Ellery Hale.

Past winners of the Hale Prize are:

See also

 List of astronomy awards
 Prizes named after people

References

Astronomy prizes
American awards
Awards established in 1978
1978 establishments in the United States
American Astronomical Society